Sabine's gull (Xema sabini) also known as the fork-tailed gull or xeme, is a small gull. It is the only species placed in the genus Xema. It breeds in colonies on coasts and tundra, laying two or three spotted olive-brown eggs in a ground nest lined with grass. Sabine's gull is pelagic outside the breeding season. It takes a wide variety of mainly animal food, and will eat any suitable small prey.

Taxonomy
Sabine's gull was formally described in 1819 by the naturalist Joseph Sabine under the binomial name Larus sabini. Sabine based his description on specimens that had been collected by his brother Captain Edward Sabine who had accompanied Captain John Ross's on a voyage to look for the Northwest Passage. The birds were found breeding on low lying islands off the west coast of Greenland in July 1818. Sabine's gull is now the only species placed in the genus Xema that was introduced in 1819 by the zoologist William Leach in an appendix to Ross's account of the voyage. The genus name Xema appears to be an invented name without meaning.

The Sabine's gull is usually treated as comprising a monotypic genus; it is placed within the genus Larus only when the genus is enlarged. The black bill and notched tail are almost unique within the gulls, as they are shared only with the swallow-tailed gull of the Galapagos. On the basis of this the two species were often thought to be each other's closest relatives, a hypothesis ruled out by a number of behaviour and ecological differences. Mitochondrial DNA studies confirmed that they are not closely related, and the closest relative of the Sabine's gull is now thought to be the ivory gull, another Arctic species. The two species are thought to have separated around 2 million years ago, longer ago than most groups of gull species.

Geographical variation is slight; birds from Alaska are slightly darker and perhaps bigger. Most authorities recognise no races, but a few recognise four based on size and mantle (back) colour. The Handbook of the Birds of the World recognises four subspecies. The nominate subspecies, X. s. sabini, breeds from the Canadian Arctic to Greenland. X. s. palaearctica (Stegman, 1934) breeds from Spitsbergen to the Taymyr Peninsula in Russia, and X. s. tschuktschorum (Portenko, 1939) breeds on the Chukotskiy Peninsula of Russia, and X. s. woznesenskii (Portenko, 1939) is found from  the Gulf of Anadyr to Alaska.

Description

The Sabine's gull is a small gull,  in length and weighing .

This species is easy to identify through its striking wing pattern. The adult has a pale grey back and wing coverts, black primary flight feathers and white secondaries. The white tail is forked. The male's hood darkens during breeding season. Young birds have a similar tricoloured wing pattern, but the grey is replaced by brown, and the tail has a black terminal band. Juveniles take two years to attain full adult plumage. Sabine's gulls have an unusual molt pattern for gulls. Fledged birds retain their juvenile plumage through the autumn and do not start molting into their first winter plumage until they have reached their wintering grounds. Adults have their complete molt in the spring prior to the spring migration, and have a partial molt in the autumn after returning to the wintering area, a reversal of the usual pattern for gulls. They have a very high-pitched and squeaking call.

Distribution and habitat
It breeds in the Arctic and has a circumpolar distribution through northernmost North America and Eurasia. It migrates south in autumn; most of the population winters at sea in the Pacific off western South America in the cold waters of the Humboldt Current, while Greenland and eastern Canadian birds cross the Atlantic by way of the westernmost fringes of Europe to winter off southwest Africa in the cold waters of the Benguela Current. Occasionally individual Sabine's gulls can be seen off other coasts such as the northeastern United States or further east in Europe, typically following autumn storms. It is recorded often enough inland in North America, Europe, and even Siberia, that it has been said to exhibit "cross-continental migration" in addition to migration at sea.

Diet and feeding
The diet and feeding technique of the Sabine's gull varies by season and habitat. In the breeding season it takes a range of freshwater and terrestrial prey on the tundra. This includes insects and probably spiders, aquatic insects and insect larvae, crustaceans, fish and young birds and eggs. Young birds and eggs are taken opportunistically and rarely, but can include black turnstones, lapland longspurs and even the eggs of other Sabine's gulls and geese. Insects and insect larvae taken include terrestrial and aquatic beetles, springtails, craneflies, mosquitos, midges, and flower flies (Syrphidae).

References

External links

 
 
 
 
 
 
 
 

Sabine's gull
Birds of the Arctic
Birds of Greenland
Birds of North Asia
Birds of Southern Africa
Sabine's gull
Taxa named by Joseph Sabine
Holarctic birds